Fallen City is a 2013 Chinese disaster film directed by Huang Hong (actor) and stars Huang Jue, Ruby Lin and Ding Yongdai.
Fallen City is chronicles the fates of a small-town policeman, a bank robber and a rebellious young woman in the aftermath of the 2008 Sichuan earthquake.

Plot
Shubei town, southeast China, the present day. Five years after he fled with RMB 800,000 from a bank robbery, Liu Chuan(Huang Jue) returns incognito to the town. Policeman Wang Laoshi(Ding Yongdai), who was on duty at the time of the robbery and was demoted for letting Liu escape, is working in the same district police station to which he was transferred after the robbery and still keeps an eye on Liu. By chance, Liu stays in some small lodgings in Wang's district where Qin Xiaosong(Ruby Lin), a psychology graduate who's run away from her domineering parents, is staying. Next day, Wang spots Liu in the street and gives chase, finally handcuffing him in a deserted warehouse. At that moment, the town is devastated by an earthquake and the building collapses. Wang is knocked unconscious and Liu steals his uniform. After rescuing Qin, Liu finds himself roped into saving other townspeople and becomes a hero in the locals' eyes. Meanwhile, Wang recovers and sets out to hunt down Liu...

Cast
 Huang Jue as Liu Chuan
 Ruby Lin as Qin Xiaoxiong
 Ding Yongdai as Wang Laoshi
 Sun Min as Fan, Civil Affairs Bureau employee
 Yu Bin as bank employee
 Li Yixiao as school head
 Hou Shijia as Li
 Zhang Jie as bank employee
 Zhu Xiaoxue as blind woman
 Tian Donglin as landlady
 Yang Yu as institute head
 Ren Shilei as shoeshine man
 Liu Fengkai as old school employee
 Tang Zuohui as bird person
 Su Su as hotpot person
 Zheng Shaoxing as man
 Xia Chengji as child
 Wu Jia as Lu Chuan's wife
 Zuo Dan as Master Wei
 Zhu Jia'ni as Miaomiao
 Ba Deng as hairdresser
 Xie Zhigang as thief)
 Huang Zijun as lame Liu
 Dong Liang as flower person
 Qing Feng as presenter
 Tang Lin as newspaper person
 Qiu Lian as teacher.

Production
The script by Huang Hong (actor) and Wang Jin Ming(王金明) takes the idea of a criminal who swaps identities with the very policeman who's been hunting him for five years and develops it into a character drama in which the former unexpectedly finds an opportunity to redeem himself for the robbery he originally committed.

Production on the film started from June 2009, First premiere of the film is 15 Jun, 2011 at Shanghai International Film Festival.

Accolades

References

External links

Chinese disaster films
2013 films
2013 drama films
2010s Mandarin-language films